Flora is a 2017 Canadian independent science fiction thriller and historical drama written and directed by Sasha Louis Vukovic.  He sought to "make a movie which is not about a bunch of kids running from a horrible slasher". The film follows a group of students on a university botany expedition as they try to survive and avoid exposure to an unknown pathogen.

The film is Sasha Louis Vukovic's directorial debut and appeared at several film festivals worldwide.

Plot
In the spring of 1929, a team of student botanists arrive in an uncharted forest somewhere in North America on expedition to chart the native flora. The students arrive to find their professor absent and their food supplies destroyed. After a day of waiting for the his return, they begin a search to find the missing professor. The professor is found deceased, wearing a gas mask, at a nearby abandoned mining town. Gradually, some of the students begin falling ill to an unknown pathogen.

The professor's protégé, Matsudaira Basho, is able to deduce from the complete absence of animal life in the region that the pathogen may be an endophyte present in the local plant life and transmitted by consumption or plants or through inhalation of pollen.  In light of the lack of food supplies, the students embark on a trek through the forest to reach a railway where they might be able to rendezvous with a monthly train that is scheduled to pass by in several days time. The students prepare foods from local plant material by boiling the harvest in order to render them non-pathogenic and create biohazard suits with gas masks to prevent infection.

Along the journey, all but one of the students falls ill to the pathogen. She arrives at the railway and sees the train coming.

Production

The film was privately funded by Vukovic’s family and friends, with a micro-budget estimated at $100,000 USD (or $120,000 CAD). Despite a budget of only $2000 for props, Vukovic was able to obtain props appropriate to the 1920s through eBay and a Canadian historian, Alan Skeoch. One of Vukovik's family members owns a 1931 Ford A Tudor which was featured in the opening of the film. Several of the cast members also participated in other aspects of the production, for example with Doran both playing the character Ora and leading Art Direction.

Principal photography was carried out over six weeks from June 29 through August 16, 2015. Post-production was completed on October 1, 2016. Filming was performed in Val-Jalbert, a preserved ghost town in Québec, as well as Ottawa and Manitoulin Island in Ontario. Post-production was performed at Eggplant Picture & Sound in Toronto and completed on October 1, 2016.

Release
Flora premiered at Sci-Fi-London on April 29, 2017 and was submitted to 70 festivals around the world. 
 
The film was released on Blu-Ray on August 7, 2018.

Reception
The screenplay for Flora, written by Sasha Vukovic, won the 2015 Van Gogh Award in the Feature Screenplay Competition. The film was praised as "a refreshing take on the ‘monster-in-the-woods’ canon" and received the Sci-Fi-London festival award for Best Feature 2017.

Other awards include the 2017 Van Gogh Cinematic Vision Award from the Amsterdam Film Festival; five awards including Best Science Fiction Feature at the Miami International Science Fiction Film Festival; The 2018 Museum of Science Fiction Maria Award for Excellence for Best Feature and Best Acting at Escape Velocity Film Festival;  and the 2017 award for Best Score at FilmQuest.

Many critics have noted the film's quality despite the extremely low budget on which it was produced. It has been compared with The Happening, and described as being atypical of the typical "nature's revenge" horror scenario. Vukovik has stated that the film is "science fact more than it is science fiction".

References

External links
 
 
 

2017 films
Canadian natural horror films
English-language Canadian films
Films set in the 1920s
Films set in 1929
2017 horror films
Canadian science fiction thriller films
2010s English-language films
2010s Canadian films